Gabriel Loreyn (1591 – 1660), was a Dutch Golden Age member of the Haarlem schutterij.

Biography
He was born in Haarlem as the son of Fermijn and Josina Verkruyssen. He became first sergeant of the St. George militia 1636-1629, then lieutenant 1642-1645, and was portrayed along with the rest of the officers of his militia  in Frans Hals' painting The Officers of the St George Militia Company in 1639. He married Geertruyt van Clarenbeek (1589-1660) on 12 April 1589.

He died in Haarlem.

References

1591 births
1660 deaths
Frans Hals
People from Haarlem